René Duguay-Trouin (1673–1736) was a French privateer and admiral.

Duguay-Trouin may also refer to:
French ship Duguay-Trouin, several ships of the French Navy
Duguay-Trouin (French privateer), several ships that the Royal Navy captured in the late 18th and early 19th centuries
Duguay-Trouin-class cruiser, a French class of light cruisers built after World War I